Russ Conway, DSM (born Trevor Herbert Stanford; 2 September 1925 – 16 November 2000) was an English popular music pianist and composer. Conway had 20 piano instrumentals in the UK Singles Chart between 1957 and 1963, including two number one hits.

Career
Conway was born in Bristol, England. He won a scholarship to Bristol Cathedral Choir School and, after leaving school at 14, was largely self-taught on piano during a three-year term in a Borstal detention centre for stealing from his employers.

During the Second World War, he was conscripted into the Royal Navy and was awarded the Distinguished Service Medal as signalman in a minesweeping flotilla "for distinguished service, efficiency and zeal" in clearance of mines in the Aegean and operations during the relief of Greece 1944–45. During his Navy service, he lost the tip of the third finger of his right hand while using a bread slicer. At the end of the war, he chose to remain in the Navy, but was discharged in 1948 because of a stomach ulcer. He joined the Merchant Navy as a baggage steward with P&O, but left after a recurrence of the complaint.

In 1955, Conway was talent-spotted while playing in a London club, and was signed to EMI's Columbia label. At Columbia, he worked with Norman Newell, who suggested he adopt the stage name of Russ Conway ('Conway' from Newell's early recording association with the singer Steve Conway, and 'Russ' from the Russ Henderson Steel Band). Conway spent the mid-1950s providing backing for artists on their roster, including Gracie Fields and Joan Regan. He recorded his first solo single, "Roll The Carpet Up" (B-side "The Westminster Waltz") in 1957.

In 1956, Conway (credited as 'Terry Stanford') composed the music for a BBC Television production of Beauty and the Beast.

Between 1957 and 1963, Conway had 20 UK chart hits, and in 1959 alone he achieved a cumulative total of 83 weeks on the UK Singles Chart. This included two self-penned number one instrumentals, "Side Saddle" and "Roulette", the latter deposing Elvis Presley's "A Fool Such As I". He appeared frequently on light entertainment TV shows and radio for many years afterwards, performing at the London Palladium on a number of occasions and becoming a regular on the Billy Cotton Band Show for several seasons. He also made recordings as a vocalist. Many of his hits feature accompaniment directed by Geoff Love.

In 1958 Conway (as "Trevor H. Stanford") composed, with Norman Newell, the music for the flop musical Mister Venus, which starred Frankie Howerd and Anton Diffring, The show, with book by Ray Galton and Johnny Speight, opened at the Prince of Wales Theatre on 23 October 1958 but closed after just sixteen performances.

He was the subject of This Is Your Life in 1959, when he was surprised by Eamonn Andrews during a recording session at the BBC's Studio 1 at 201 Piccadilly, London.

His career was blighted by ill health, including a nervous breakdown and subsequently a stroke, which prevented him from performing between 1968 and 1971. He also at times drank heavily and smoked up to 80 cigarettes a day. He was prescribed anti-depressants and had periods of severe self-doubt, but he kept up playing. Having been diagnosed with stomach cancer in the late 1980s, in 1990 he founded the Russ Conway Cancer Fund with his friend, writer and broadcaster Richard Hope-Hawkins, and they staged charity gala shows in major theatres that raised thousands of pounds for cancer charities.

He appeared as himself in French and Saunders' 1994 Christmas special, playing "Side Saddle"—or, in an alternative edit, the Gerry and the Pacemakers hit "I Like It"—in their spoof of The Piano.

In the documentary Frankie Howerd: The Lost Tapes, Barry Cryer, commenting on Howerd not coming out as gay, also said that Russ Conway did not, as in 'those days' it would have been career suicide. Conway said in 1995 that he was unsure about his sexuality: "I haven't the faintest idea what it is....I was certainly no angel in my younger days and I have tried everything there is to try."

Conway, who never married, died on 16 November 2000, just two weeks after his last public performance.

Richard Hope-Hawkins delivered the main eulogy at the funeral held at the historic St Mary's Church, Redcliffe, Bristol. Elton John sent a wreath. In 2001 Hope-Hawkins devised, staged and directed a tribute to Conway at the Colston Hall, Bristol, with an all-star cast. The £11,000 raised by the event was donated to St Peter's Hospice, Bristol.

Conway could not read music, so the published sheet music of his work is inaccurate and simplified. Pianist Mike Thomson (1946–2018) produced some faithful transcriptions, but they were not able to be fully published due to copyright issues.

Discography

LPs
 Piano Requests (1958)	
 Pack Up Your Troubles (1958) – UK Albums Chart No. 9
 Songs To Sing in Your Bath (1959) – UK No. 8
 Family Favourites (1959) – UK No. 3
 Time To Celebrate (1959) – UK No. 3		
 My Concerto For You (1960) – UK No. 5 	
 Party Time (1960) – UK No. 7
 At the Theatre (1961)
 At the Cinema (1961)
 Happy Days (1961)
 Concerto For Dreamers (1962)
 Russ Conway's Trad Party (1962)
 Something For Mum (1963)
 Enjoy Yourself (1964)
 Concerto for Lovers (1964)
 Roll Up The Carpet (1964)*
 Russ Conway Favourites (1965)*
 Once More it's Party Time (1965)
 Russ Hour (1966) 
 Time to Play (1966)
 Pop-a-Conway (1966)
 Concerto for Memories (1966)
 Russ Conway Plays (1968)*
 Russ Conway plays Jolson Hits (1969)*
 The New Side of Russ Conway (1971)		
 Russ Conway playing the Great Piano Hits (1973)		
 Russ Conway with Songs from Stage & Screen (1974)		
 The Very Best of Russ Conway (1976)*		
 Russ Conway Presents 24 Piano Greats (1977)* – UK No. 25
 Russ Conway - The One and Only (1979)*
 Always You and Me (1981)* - double LP
 Russ Conway and his Happy Piano (1985)
 The Two Sides of Russ Conway (1986)*
 A Long Time Ago (1986)
 Russ Conway: The Best of the EMI Years (1989)*
 Russ Conway: The EP Collection (1991)* 
* denotes compilation albums.

Singles

See also
 List of best-selling music artists

References

External links
Russ Conway
Russ Conway – British Pianist
Appearance on Desert Island Discs
Daily Telegraph obituary

1925 births
2000 deaths
20th-century English composers
20th-century English musicians
20th-century British pianists
Billy Cotton Band Show
Columbia Graphophone Company artists
Cub Records artists
English pianists
English songwriters
Male composers
Musicians from Bristol
Recipients of the Distinguished Service Medal (United Kingdom)
People educated at Bristol Cathedral Choir School
Royal Navy personnel of World War II
Royal Navy sailors
20th-century British male musicians
British male songwriters